Hong Kong Productivity Council (HKPC) is a multi-disciplinary organisation, which is tasked with promoting and assisting the Hong Kong business sectors, established in 1967 by the "Hong Kong Productivity Council Ordinance".

HKPC is committed to promote productivity excellence through relentless drive of world-class advanced technologies and innovative service offerings to support Hong Kong enterprises. Being a key enabler of Industry 4.0 and Enterprise 4.0, HKPC strives to facilitate “new industrialisation” in Hong Kong, as well as bolstering Hong Kong to be an international innovation and technology hub and a smart city. The Council offers comprehensive innovative solutions for Hong Kong industries and enterprises, enabling them to achieve resources and productivity utilisation, effectiveness and cost reduction, amid enhancing competitiveness in both local and overseas marketplaces. The Council partners and collaborates with local industries and enterprises and world-class R&D institutes to develop applied technology solutions for value creation. It also benefits a variety of sectors through product innovation, technology transfer, and commercialisation, bringing enormous business opportunities ahead. HKPC’s world-class R&D achievements have been widely recognised over the years, winning an array of local, Mainland and international accolades. In addition, HKPC offers SMEs and startups immediate and timely assistance in coping with the ever-changing business environment, as well as enhancing their competitive edges by providing a variety of FutureSkills trainings to upskill and nurture talent with digital capabilities and TechEd competencies.

HKPC’s headquarter is located at the HKPC Building at 78 Tat Chee Avenue, Kowloon, founded in 1990. HKPC is partially funded by the HKSAR Government, and the rest of incomes from services fees.

HKPC has established consulting subsidiaries in Shenzhen and Dongguan to serve Hong Kong–owned enterprises in the Mainland.

Governance
HKPC is governed by a Council with representatives from managerial, labour, academic, professional, and government departments concerned with productivity issues.

Organisation Structure 
Digital Branch

 Digital Transformation Division
 Smart Manufacturing Division
 Robotics and Artificial Intelligence Division
 Mainland Division
 Commercialisation and Business Development Unit

Funding Scheme Branch

 Funding Schemes Division
 Technology Funding Division

Living Innovation Branch

 Automotive Platforms and Application Systems R&D Centre
 Green Living and Innovation Division
 InnoPreneur (SME & Startup Growth) and FutureSkills Division
 Smart City Division

Compliance and Internal Audit Office

Corporate Development Division

Council Secretariat

Finance and Procurement Division

Human Resources and Facility Management Division

Services 

 “New Industrialisation” 
 IIoT
 A.I. & Robotics
 Novel Materials
 Advanced Manufacturing Technology
 Digital Transformation
 Smart Mobility
 Green Technology
 Food Technology
 GeronTech
 Corporate Sustainability
 Testing & Standards
 Other services:
 Inno Space: Inno Space promotes TechEd education and entrepreneurship, and launches pilot schemes for secondary schools, universities, and higher education institutions. Through offering technical support and knowledge sharing, Inno Space helps startups and inventors to translate their innovative ideas into industrial designs, prototypes, and products, building an eco-system in the startup scene and facilitating the development of “new industralisation”.
 SME ReachOut: Through face-to-face consultations, SME ReachOut helps SMEs identify suitable funding schemes and answer questions related to applications. The goal is to enhance SME’s understanding of the Government’s funding schemes, with a view to encouraging better utilisation of the support provided by the Government.
 HKPC Academy: HKPC Academy provides enterprises and individuals with various professional training services to enhance their knowledge and capabilities.
 Hong Kong Computer Emergency Response Team Coordination Centre (HKCERT): HKCERT serves local enterprises and Internet users through facilitating information dissemination, providing advice on preventive measures against security threats, and promoting information security awareness.

Subsidiaries 
Hong Kong Subsidiaries

 HKPC Technology (Holdings) Company Limited
 Productivity (Holdings) Limited and Wholly Foreign Owned Enterprises in the GBA

Mainland Subsidiaries / Joint Venture Company

 Productivity (Dongguan) Consulting Company Limited
 Productivity (Shenzhen) Consulting Company Limited
 HKPC GBA FutureSkills Centre
 HKPC Shenzhen Innovation and Technology Centre (Futian)

Office 
Hong Kong headquarter: HKPC Building, 78 Tat Chee Avenue, Kowloon, Hong Kong

Mainland: 

 Productivity (Dongguan) Consulting Co., Ltd: Room 208, Block 4, Creative Industry Park, NO.34 Guantai Road, Dongguan, Guangdong, PRC 
 Productivity (Shenzhen) Consulting Co., Ltd: 18 Floor, Building 1, CFC Tower, No.5 Shihua Road, Futian Free Trade Zone, Shenzhen, PRC

References

Business organisations based in Hong Kong
Manufacturing in Hong Kong
Yau Yat Tsuen
Productivity organizations